Gösta Hallberg (4 August 1891 – 16 November 1978) was a Swedish athlete who competed in the 1912 Summer Olympics. In 1912 he finished 13th in the high jump competition.

References

External links
 profile

1891 births
1978 deaths
Swedish male high jumpers
Olympic athletes of Sweden
Athletes (track and field) at the 1912 Summer Olympics
20th-century Swedish people